Amorbia laterculana is a species of moth of the family Tortricidae. It is found from Guatemala to Sinaloa in Mexico, where it is found at altitudes between 1,700 and 2,800 meters.

The length of the forewings is 12.3–14 mm for males and 13–17 mm for females. The ground colour of the forewings is pale brown to brown. The hindwings are beige. Adults are on wing from May to November, as well as in February.

The larvae feed on Lantana camara.

References

Moths described in 1877
Sparganothini
Moths of North America